United Civic Alliance Party is a political party in the Republic of Artsakh, founded on 29 September 2018.

Electoral record 
The party participated in the 2020 Artsakhian general election as a part of the Free Motherland - UCA Alliance. Following the election, the alliance won 16 seats out of 33 in the National Assembly.

Ideology 
The parties support base is primarily among youth and young professionals. The party supports the socio-economic development of Artsakh, the creation of a strong civil-society, and increasing the welfare of citizens. The party is in favour of the reunification of Artsakh with Armenia.

See also 

 List of political parties in Artsakh

External links 
 United Civic Alliance on Facebook

References 

Political parties in the Republic of Artsakh
Political parties established in 2018
2019 establishments in Armenia